Henry Joseph Murphy (9 February 1921 – 26 November 2006) was a Liberal party member of the House of Commons of Canada. He was born in Moncton, New Brunswick and became a barrister by career after attending the law program at the University of New Brunswick.

He was first elected at the Westmorland riding in the 1953 general election. Murphy was re-elected for a second term in 1957 then defeated in the 1958 election by William Creaghan of the Progressive Conservative party.

Murphy also served in municipal politics from 1951 to 1953 as both a city alderman for Moncton City Council and a regional councillor for Westmorland County.

In 1960, Murphy was appointed as a provincial judge by New Brunswick premier Louis Robichaud. Murphy had earlier competed against Robichaud for the role of provincial Liberal leader.

He was married to Joan Helena Barry and had four children; F. Patrick Murphy (engineer), Julia P. Murphy (teacher), Henry J. Murphy, QC (lawyer), and Michael B. Murphy (lawyer/politician). Upon his retirement from the bench Murphy was counsel with his son Henry's law firm Murphy Collette Murphy.

One of Murphy's nephews, Brian Murphy, became a Member of Parliament for Moncton—Riverview—Dieppe in 2006.  His son Michael B. (Mike) Murphy is a prominent New Brunswick trial lawyer and was Minister of Health and later Attorney General, before resigning in January 2010 to return to the practice of law.  In 2012, he followed in his father's footsteps to seek the leadership of the provincial Liberal Party but was also defeated by a young francophone lawyer from Kent County.

References

External links
 

1921 births
2006 deaths
Judges in New Brunswick
Lawyers in New Brunswick
Liberal Party of Canada MPs
Members of the House of Commons of Canada from New Brunswick
Moncton city councillors
University of New Brunswick alumni
University of New Brunswick Faculty of Law alumni